The Calapooia River is an  tributary of the Willamette River in the U.S. state of Oregon.

The Calapooia flows generally northwest from its source in the Cascade Range near Tidbits Mountain. In its upper reaches, it passes through parts of the Willamette National Forest. Further downstream, it flows through Holley then Crawfordsville and Brownsville in the Willamette Valley before joining the Willamette at Albany. The city of Tangent is also near the river on a branch of one of its downstream tributaries, Lake Creek.

The Calapooia was named for the Kalapuya (also spelled Calapooia), a tribe of Native Americans.

Tributaries
Named tributaries of the river from source to mouth are Eighteen, Treadwell, and United States creeks followed by the North Fork Calapooia River. Then come King, Potts, Barrett/Hands, Washout, McKinley and Blue creeks. Further downstream are Biggs, Fox, Sweet Honey, Cedar, Pugh, Sawyer, Johnson, and Brush creeks. Finally come Warren, Cochrane, Courtney, Lake, and Oak creeks.

Dams

The Brownsville Dam was built in the late 1800s, later rebuilt as a small concrete dam.  It was removed in 2007 to allow better fish passage and address safety concerns.

The small Sodom Dam and Shearer Dam were both removed in 2011, leaving the Calapooia River free of any human-made dams.

See also
List of rivers of Oregon
List of longest streams of Oregon

References

External links

Tributaries of the Willamette River
Rivers of Linn County, Oregon
Rivers of Oregon
Oregon placenames of Native American origin